OAQ may refer to:

Quito Astronomical Observatory (Observatorio Astronómico de Quito)
Overall Allotment Quantity
Ordre des architectes du Québec
The Swiss Center of Accreditation and Quality Assurance in Higher Education, OAQ